Jean-Baptiste Bottex (June 24, 1918 – May 28, 1979) was a Haitian painter. Hailing from Port Margot in northern Haiti, Bottex painted scenes from the Bible and daily Haitian life. His works were of the Naïve style and were displayed at the Centre d'Art. His younger brother, Seymour Bottex, (born 1922) is  also a noted painter.

References
 

1918 births
1979 deaths
20th-century Haitian painters
20th-century Haitian male artists
Haitian male painters